The Restaurant Miniature Buffet (or RMB) is a British Railways Mark 1 railway coach. It is a Tourist Standard Open (TSO) coach with two full seating bays next to the centre transverse vestibule removed and replaced with a buffet counter and customers standing space, and one bay on one side (same side as the buffet counter) removed and replaced with a store cupboard on the other side of the centre vestibule.  They were built in five lots from 1957 to 1962. 

Quite a few still operate on the national network on Railtours, but not on service trains. A lot have made it into railway preservation and are used by many heritage railways in the UK. Even though the first batch had no store cupboard 1807 on the Watercress has been fitted with one and B4 Bogies.

List of Preserved RMBs

References 

British Rail coaching stock